Salvador Navarrete (born 16 February 1992), better known by his stage name Sega Bodega, is an Irish-Scottish music producer, singer, songwriter, DJ and co-head/founder of record label and collective Nuxxe. Sega Bodega is known for his futuristic, bass-heavy and leftfield takes on electronic and club music, fusing various elements of UK bass and hip-hop music, deconstructed club, and trip hop music into his songs. He has also been heavily associated with the hyperpop music scene. He rose to prominence producing tracks for London-based rapper, co-founder of the Nuxxe label and close collaborator Shygirl, gaining attention from the likes of Rihanna, using various Nuxxe tracks for her Fenty Beauty commercials and fashion shows. Sega Bodega released various EPs before releasing his debut album, Salvador, in 2020, and his second album, Romeo, in 2021.

Early life 
Salvador Navarrete was born on 16 February 1992, in Galway, Ireland to a Chilean father and an Irish mother. He lived in Ireland until he was 10, when he relocated to Glasgow.

He had ambitions of being a producer since 2008, playing in various bands until he could understand how to use DAWs. Navarrete briefly studied at the Royal Conservatoire of Scotland, but largely taught himself to produce music using online tutorials.

Initially, from about 2010, Navarrete operated under the moniker Peace, but retired it when the indie rock band of the same name began rising to fame. He would later settle on his Sega Bodega moniker in 2012.

Career

2012–2015: Early beginnings 
Sega Bodega first began gaining traction through various remixes, from which he gained widespread attention from, and DJ gigs, supporting Lil B in Glasgow and playing the London Field Day festival in 2012.

In February 2013, Sega Bodega released his debut EP Song Dynasty, a collection of tracks recorded as far back as 2010, but refined and polished after developing a better understanding of the technicalities to music production. The EP was released via the London-based label, Week of Wonders. This was followed by his 34 EP, released in May 2013, also via the Week of Wonders label.

In May 2014, Sega Bodega was a part of the lineup for BBC Radio 1’s Big Weekend festival, where he played his re-released single "Stay Nervous", and "Maryland", which would later appear on his 2018 EP self*care, among other tracks. He also relocated to London in 2014.

After taking a hiatus from releases, Sega Bodega returned with the October 2015 release of the first SS project, containing reimagined and 'alternative' takes on cult film scores, such as A Clockwork Orange, Eraserhead, Akira and Boyz n the Hood, among others. The project was self-released. This was followed shortly after by the Sportswear EP, released via the Activia Benz label.

2016–2018: Nuxxe, Ess B, the start of collaboration and self*care 
In June 2016, London rapper Shygirl released her debut single, "Want More", produced by Sega Bodega. The single marked the first release of collective and label Nuxxe, co-founded by Sega Bodega, Shygirl and French producer and performer Coucou Chloe, formed from a desire to create music and art with an easy-going, free-flowing and fun attitude, separate from other pre-establishing labels, and to introduce a sound that no one had heard before to the world. The single would also appear in a Fenty Beauty commercial later in 2019. The release of "Want More" was followed by a collaborative single in October 2016 from Sega Bodega and Coucou Chloe titled "SPIT INTENT", under the moniker Y1640.

February 2017 marked further collaboration with the single "CC", featuring Shygirl. The track was the lead single from Sega Bodega's next EP, titled Ess B, released later that month via the Crazylegs label, followed by one other Crazylegs release: the "Nivea" double single in July. More Nuxxe releases continued shortly after Ess B's release, such as another Y1640 single in March, titled "WEEP", Shygirl's double single "MSRYNVR" in May, and Coucou Chloe's EP Erika Jane in September, on which Sega Bodega is featured. In October, Sega Bodega released a second installation of the cinema-inspired project, SS, featuring more reimagined takes on film scores such as Requiem for a Dream (this track also features Shygirl on vocals), Alien and Ghost in the Shell, among others.

March 2018 marked the first release from French singer and producer Oklou on the Nuxxe label: her EP The Rite of May, on which Sega Bodega contributed co-production on the final track, "Friendless". Sega Bodega also released a piano version of the song later in the year. The two would continue to collaborate further down the line.

In May 2018, Shygirl released her debut EP via Nuxxe, Cruel Practice, featuring production from Sega Bodega on every track. The EP gained positive attention from multiple high-profile publications, such as Pitchfork, Crack Magazine and Tiny Mixtapes.

In October 2018, Sega Bodega unveiled his next EP, self*care, his first full-length project released via Nuxxe.  For the EP Sega Bodega invited 6 filmmakers, Bryan M. Ferguson, Brooke Candy, Jade Jackman, Tash Tung, Jasper Jarvis and BEA1991 to create their own interpretations of 'self care'. The EP also marked a new direction for Sega Bodega, as he began using his own vocals more prominently than on any other previous release. The EP is also notable for having artwork designed by PC Music musician and visual artist Hannah Diamond.

2019–present: Salvador and Romeo 
In January 2019, Sega Bodega surprise released the "Mimi" single, as well as playing a headlining live show in London's Hoxton Hall in February.

2019 bore many collaborations with other indie artists, such as Cosima, Col3trane, Nadia Tehran and MISOGI, among others, as well as further collaborations with Oklou and Shygirl. Nuxxe also released Coucou Chloe's Naughty Dog EP in May.

2019 also marked Nuxxe's highest profile artist signing and album release: American rapper and singer Brooke Candy and her October-released debut album, SEXORCISM. The album features a slew of features from the likes of Charli XCX, Iggy Azalea and Rico Nasty, among many others. Candy had faced many delays and blocks towards releasing her debut album, with plans to release it dating as far back as 2014. When Candy and Sega Bodega spoke on a panel together for LoomFest May 2019 in Barcelona, Candy was made aware of the Nuxxe label that Sega Bodega co-runs and conversations on releasing the album on Nuxxe were struck. Sega Bodega himself co-produced one track on the album: the single "Drip" featuring American singer, actress and television personality Erika Jayne.

In November 2019, Sega Bodega released the single "U Suck", which would be the lead single for his debut album Salvador. The single delved into a more synth-pop direction, and again featured Sega Bodega's vocals prominently. He then played a headlining show in St Pancras Old Church, London with a backing string quartet in December, to promote the single and premiere upcoming music from his album. The track was also accompanied with a music video by frequent collaborator Bryan M. Ferguson.

In early January 2020, Sega Bodega announced his debut album Salvador for a 14 February release. The same day as the announcement, he released the single "Salv Goes to Hollywood". The track combines the more vocal-heavy ideas of his recent work, with his roots in deconstructed club music and intense bass.

Salvador was released in February to acclaim from publications like Paste Magazine, Resident Advisor and Pitchfork, among others, and fans alike.

Sega Bodega additionally released a Bandcamp exclusive covers EP, titled Reestablishing Connection, in May 2020. All profits were donated to the AIM COVID-19 Crisis Fund. It featured Lafawndah, covering Massive Attack's "Teardrop", Låpsley, covering Gwen Stefani's "Cool", Dorian Electra, covering Wheatus' "Teenage Dirtbag", Teddy<3, covering Britney Spears' "Sometimes", and Oklou, covering Mauro Picotto's "Komodo".

Sega Bodega also continued to collaborate with Oklou on her debut mixtape Galore, released in September, contributing production to two tracks, and Shygirl's ALIAS EP, released in November, acting as co-executive producer alongside Shygirl on the project. Among these established collaborators, Sega Bodega also contributed heavily to American rapper Zebra Katz's debut record LESS IS MOOR in March, and appeared on Dorian Electra's My Agenda project in October, as a featured artist (which was his first time appearing as such) and as a co-producer on two tracks.

In early November, Sega Bodega released a collaborative single with English musician Låpsley, titled "Make U Stay". The track was released with a music video directed by regular collaborator Bryan M. Ferguson.

In an Instagram Q&A in early May 2021, Sega Bodega revealed a slew of artists he has been collaborating with, including Caroline Polachek, Arca, FKA Twigs, Charlotte Gainsbourg, Slowthai, and Christine and the Queens, among many others. The same month, he announced a vinyl reissue of his Salvador album, including the bonus track "Heaven Fell (Reprise)", which features additional vocals from Polachek. He also hosted a special concert performance film, available via ticket purchase, to close off the era of the Salvador album.

Sega Bodega released a single titled "Only Seeing God When I Come" on 8 September, indicative of a new musical era, followed soon after by "Angel On My Shoulder", and the announcement of his second studio album, Romeo, which released 12 November 2021, and features Arca and Charlotte Gainsbourg. "I Need Nothing From You" was released as the final single from the album.

Personal life 
Sega Bodega has been open about his struggles with alcoholism, stating he often hid his anxieties behind drinking, "For the first two years when I got to London, I kind of just partied more, and more... I was the intense guy who was always drunk. It actually takes a long time to re-establish yourself as not 'that' person." He has also stated that quitting alcohol was the hardest thing he has ever done.

Sega Bodega has also been open about his struggles with mental health, writing an op-ed and guide on self-care in 2018 for i-D, coinciding with the release of his EP titled self*care.

Discography

Albums

EPs

Mixtapes

Singles

Remixes

Other tracks

Songwriting and production credits

References 

Living people
1992 births
Scottish singer-songwriters